Goremykino is a rural locality (a village) in Gorod Vyazniki, Vyaznikovsky District, Vladimir Oblast, Russia. The population was 2 as of 2010.

Geography 
Goremykino is located 15 km east of Vyazniki (the district's administrative centre) by road. Voynovo is the nearest rural locality.

References 

Rural localities in Vyaznikovsky District